"Maniac" is a song performed by American girl group Girlicious. Released as the second single from their second album, Rebuilt. It officially impacted Canadian radio on March 23, 2010. It was released to iTunes Canada on April 6, 2010, and reached #74 on the Canadian Hot 100. It performed best on the Serbian Top 50 singles, where it charted for eleven weeks and reached #11.

Writing and inspiration
"Maniac" was written by Brent Paschke, Drew Ryan Scott & Joacim Persson. Natalie Mejia explained the main concept behind the song saying, "It is just about a love that kind of drives you crazy. You know how love can be. It is a universal law". Nichole Cordova later added, "We've all been through that crazy love, so that's what the song is about."

Performance
The single was performed for the first time on March 12 at CHUM FM FanFest 2010. On 4 June 2010, they performed the single at Toronto Pride.

Release
On March 22, 2010 a 1:30 clip of the song premiered on the girl's official website and Myspace.
A day later on March 23, 2010 the song was sent to top 40 Canadian radio stations for mainstream radio play. The single was digitally released to iTunes Canada on April 6, 2010.

Chart performance
On the week of May 25, 2010 "Maniac" entered and peaked on the Canadian Hot 100 at number seventy-four. It remained on the chart for two weeks. On the Serbian Top 50 singles, the song charted for eleven weeks and reached a peak of number eleven.

On Portal PopLine MTV Brazil, the "Maniac" video became the most requested and watched video ever, with more than 200 000 views.

Music video

Background

The music video for "Maniac" was shot on April 6, 2010 in East Los Angeles, California at the Linda Vista Community Hospital. The video was directed by Kyle Davison. It premiered on May 4, 2010. The girls were featured in a special "On Set" with Much Music where the video initially premiered. While shooting the "On Set" the girls explained the main concept behind the video, "Basically were the patients, [...] we act as if were insane, mad women. It's new, it's exciting, it's something we haven't done yet."

Synopsis
The video starts off with the three girls seen in separate cages dancing. It then cuts to Chrystina's respective solo where she is seen on an operating room table surrounded by male dancers. The following scene shows all three girls performing choreography while walking down a hallway. Nichole in her respective solo, is seen on a bed singing her verses while being loured by male dancers. After another scene of choreography in water this time, the video cuts to Natalie's respective solo; She is seen in a corner with a spotlight on her with male backup dancers. In the final scene, the girls and male dancers are seen performing more choreography until the girls are eventually locked up by the male dancers. This was the last music video to feature the group before the disbandment in 2011.

Chart positions

Radio date and release history

References

2010 singles
Girlicious songs
Songs written by Joacim Persson
2010 songs
Universal Music Canada singles
Songs written by Drew Ryan Scott